Çandır is a town and district of Yozgat Province in the Central Anatolia region of Turkey. According to 2000 census, population of the district is 19,037 of which 13,449 live in the town of Çandır.

On March 2, 2022, an F1 tornado touched down in Çandır.

Notes

References

External links
 District municipality's official website 
 General information on Çandır 

Districts of Yozgat Province
Populated places in Yozgat Province